The Frauen-Bundesliga 1999–2000 was the 10th season of the Frauen-Bundesliga, Germany's premier football league. It began on 29 August 1999 and ended on 21 May 2000.

Final standings

Results

Top scorers

References

1999-2000
Ger
1
Women